John J. McCarthy (July 19, 1927 – November 9, 2001) was an American Democratic Party politician who served in the New Jersey General Assembly and as a Councilman and as Mayor of Garwood, New Jersey.  McCarthy was elected to the State Assembly in 1973, defeating incumbent Republican C. Louis Bassano in the Democratic Watergate landslide. He won by 5,503 votes.  He did not seek re-election to a second term in 1975.

References

1927 births
2001 deaths
Mayors of places in New Jersey
Democratic Party members of the New Jersey General Assembly
People from Garwood, New Jersey
Politicians from Union County, New Jersey
20th-century American politicians